"Ev'ry Day of My Life" is a popular song written in 1954 by Al Jacobs and Jimmie Crane.

First recordings
Two of the most successful versions of this song were recorded by Malcolm Vaughan and The McGuire Sisters. Malcolm Vaughan's version reached No. 5 on the United Kingdom's New Musical Express chart in 1955, while The McGuire Sisters version reached No. 37 on the US Billboard Top 100 and No. 33 Cash Box in 1956.

Bobby Vinton recording
The most widely successful version of the song was recorded in 1972 by Bobby Vinton and released on Epic Records. Vinton's version spent 16 weeks on the Billboard Hot 100 chart, peaking at No. 24, while reaching No. 2 on Billboard's Easy Listening chart. It also reached No. 18 on Cash Box.

In Canada, the song reached No. 14 on the RPM 100, while reaching No. 32 on RPM Weekly's "The Programmers MOR Playlist". It was awarded "Most Played Award" for 1972 by the Juke Box Association of America as well.

The single release was Vinton's most successful single since the million-selling "I Love How You Love Me" in 1969, and spawned the album Ev'ry Day of My Life, which also charted on the Billboard Top LPs & Tape chart, peaking at #72. The LP Arranged and Produced by Jimmy "The Wiz" Wisner and Co-produced, recorded and mixed by Jim Reeves at Columbia Records, NYC in Studio B & C.

Other cover versions
Another version recorded in 1972, was by Jerry Vale, on his "Alone Again (Naturally)" LP.

References

1954 songs
1956 singles
1972 singles
The McGuire Sisters songs
Bobby Vinton songs
Songs written by Jimmie Crane
Songs written by Al Jacobs